The Essential is a compilation album by American alternative rock band Concrete Blonde, released in 2005.

Critical reception

Johnny Loftus, writing for AllMusic, noted the compilation's similarity to the band's 2002 compilation Classic Masters, but felt that like its 2002 predecessor, The Essential fails to "adequately replace" the 1996 compilation Recollection: The Best of Concrete Blonde. Loftus noted the omission of tracks from the band's 1993 album Mexican Moon and also the lack of any unreleased material. He concluded it was "a pretty satisfactory overview of Concrete Blonde's IRS output" and "probably OK for the casual fan". PopMatters described The Essential as "very good, if flawed overview of these cult darlings". They also noted the lack of any songs from Mexican Moon and also questioned whether the inclusion of "Little Wing" and "Roses Grow" can be considered essential.

Track listing

Personnel
 Frank Collura – compilation producer
 Evren Goknar – mastering
 Asterik Studio – design
 Diana Barnes – art direction
 Gerri Miller – liner notes
 Paul Natkin, Chansley Entertainment Archives – band photography

References

Concrete Blonde albums
2005 compilation albums
Capitol Records compilation albums
EMI Records compilation albums